"Bless Me" is a song performed by American contemporary worship collective Maverick City Music and American gospel musician Kirk Franklin. The song was released on May 20, 2022, as a promotional single from their collaborative live album, Kingdom Book One (2022). The song was written by Kirk Franklin.

"Bless Me" debuted at number 19 on the US Hot Christian Songs chart, and at number eight on the Hot Gospel Songs chart.

Background
On June 3, 2022, Maverick City Music and Kirk Franklin released "Bless Me" as the second promotional single from Kingdom Book One (2022), accompanied with its music video. The song follows after the release of "Kingdom" as the first promotional single from the album.

Composition

Accolades

Commercial performance
"Bless Me" debuted at number 19 on the US Hot Christian Songs chart, and number eight on the Hot Gospel Songs chart dated June 18, 2022.

Music video
On June 3, 2022, Kirk Franklin released the official music video of "Bless Me" via YouTube. The video shows Kirk Franklin and Maverick City Music performing the song alongside inmates at the Everglades Correctional Institution in Miami-Dade, Florida.

Charts

Weekly charts

Year-end charts

Release history

References

External links
 

2022 songs
Maverick City Music songs
Kirk Franklin songs
Songs written by Kirk Franklin